A "Black Lives Matter" street mural has been painted in Cincinnati, in the U.S. state of Ohio.

The mural appears on Plum Street between Eighth and Ninth streets.

History
Black Art Speaks, ArtsWave, and ArtWorks painted the mural in front of the Cincinnati City Hall in June 2020.

Plans for a $118,000 restoration were confirmed in June 2021. Black Art Speaks completed the restoration. City manager Paula Boggs Muething recommended using $250,000 in federal stimulus money from the American Rescue Plan to fund the project. Cincinnati City Council approved spending $125,000. Some streets were closed during the renovation. A block party was held on the site.

See also
 2020 in art

References

External links

 

2020 establishments in Ohio
2020 paintings
2020s murals
Black Lives Matter art
Paintings in Cincinnati
Murals in Ohio